"Con Tu Nombre" (English: "With Your Name") is the fourth single from Ricky Martin's first live album, MTV Unplugged (2006). It was released on June 26, 2007. The song was written by Cristian Zalles and Juan Carlos Pérez Soto, and produced by Tommy Torres. The Salsa Version was produced by Mike Rivera.

Chart performance
In the United States, the song reached number forty-seven on Billboards Hot Latin Songs chart and number fifteen on Latin Pop Airplay.

Formats and track listingsUS promotional CD single"Con Tu Nombre" (Radio Edit) – 3:43
"Con Tu Nombre" (Salsa Version) – 3:55Mexican digital single'
"Con Tu Nombre" (Salsa Version) – 3:55

Charts

References

2007 singles
Ricky Martin songs
Spanish-language songs
2006 songs
Live singles

th:มายเลิฟ (เพลงเซลีน ดิออน)